Subhro J Ganguly is a Bollywood singer and composer  who has sung the songs Paisa Yeh Paisa and Mungda for the movie Total Dhamaal. His music video single Dil Zara Tu Sunn was released by Zee Music in 2017.

It featured him with Raveena Taurani and was composed by Sachin Gupta and directed by Kookie Gulati.

Early life and education 
Subhro hails from Kolkata . He began did his education from The Doon School , Dehradun and later attended college at St Xavier's College, Mumbai.

Career 
He got his break as a composer by composing the title song along with Raju Singh  for the television show – Mission Sapne that aired on Colors. It had various celebrities like Salman Khan , Karan Johar, Varun Dhawan.

The song was sung by Mika Singh where he won best singer award at ITA. (Indian Television Awards) 2015.

He recently composed the Title track for Femina Miss India 2018

Subhro began his live performances by winning a competition where he got to open for Arijit Singh in 2015.

He later got a chance to perform at MTV Bollyland with Mika Singh, Sukhwinder Singh and many others.

He now has performed in many cities like  in India and across the world.

References

External links 

 
 
 
 

Living people
21st-century Indian singers
Indian composers
Year of birth missing (living people)
The Doon School alumni
St. Xavier's College, Mumbai alumni
Musicians from Kolkata